Ranjangaon Road railway station is a small railway station in Ahmadnagar district, Maharashtra. Its code is RNJD. It serves Ranjangaon Mashid village. This village in Parner Taluka of Ahmadnagar district. The station consists of one platform. The platform is not well sheltered. It lacks many facilities including water and sanitation.

Trains 
 Manmad–Pune Passenger
 Daund–Hazur Sahib Nanded Passenger
 Pune–Nizamabad Passenger

References

Railway stations in Pune district
Solapur railway division